Harry W. Kessler (August 15, 1927 – January 2, 2007) was a Democratic politician who served as the Mayor of the City of Toledo, Ohio from January 27, 1971 until December 1, 1977.

1971–1977: Toledo Mayor
1969–1970: Toledo Vice Mayor
1965–1969: Toledo City Councilman
1978–1991: Toledo Municipal Court Clerk of Courts
1992–1995: Board Member, Toledo Public Schools
1979–1998: Board Member, Toledo Lucas-County Public Library

He has also served as President of the Toledo Lucas County Visitors & Convention Bureau.

1927 births
2007 deaths
Mayors of Toledo, Ohio
20th-century American politicians